Medigeshi or Midigeshi is a village in Madhugiri Taluk, Tumkur district in Karnataka, India. It has a population of 2,649 according to 2011 census. The village has a fort which is a tourist attraction.

References 

Villages in Tumkur district